Hana Kuk is a Cantopop Hong Kong female singer-songwriter. She debuted in 2016 by releasing the single, Today's Me. She gained commercial success by singing the soundtracks from TVB. In November 2017, she released her debut album, Forget Myself.

Music Awards

Cantonese Songs Chart Awards

Chinese Golden Melody Awards

Jade Solid Gold Best Ten Music Awards Presentation

Jade Solid Gold Songs Selections

Metro Showbiz Hit Awards

RTHK Top 10 Gold Songs Awards Ceremony
The RTHK Top 10 Gold Songs Awards Ceremony(:zh:十大中文金曲頒獎音樂會) is held annually in Hong Kong since 1978.  The awards are determined by Radio and Television Hong Kong based on the work of all Asian artists (mostly cantopop) for the previous year.

StarHub TVB Awards

TVB Star Awards Malaysia

TVB Anniversary Awards

References

Lists of awards received by Hong Kong musician